aka Torasan and a Lovely Maid is a 1978 Japanese comedy film directed by Yoji Yamada. It stars Kiyoshi Atsumi as Torajirō Kuruma (Tora-san), and Reiko Ōhara as his love interest or "Madonna". Talk of the Town Tora-san is the twenty-second entry in the popular, long-running Otoko wa Tsurai yo series.

Synopsis
Mistakenly believing that his brother-in-law's boss is planning to commit suicide, Tora-san attempts to prevent him.

Cast
 Kiyoshi Atsumi as Torajirō
 Chieko Baisho as Sakura
 Reiko Ōhara as Sanae Arakawa
 Shimojo Masami as Kuruma Tatsuzō
 Chieko Misaki as Tsune Kuruma (Torajiro's aunt)
 Gin Maeda as Hiroshi Suwa
 Hayato Nakamura as Mitsuo Suwa
 Hisao Dazai as Boss (Umetarō Katsura)
 Gajirō Satō as Genkō
 Chishū Ryū as Gozen-sama

Critical appraisal
For his performance in Talk of the Town Tora-san and the previous entry in the series, Stage-Struck Tora-san (also 1978) Kiyoshi Atsumi was nominated for Best Actor at the Japan Academy Prize ceremony. Yoji Yamada was also nominated for Best Director at the ceremony for these two film. The German-language site molodezhnaja gives Talk of the Town Tora-san three and a half out of five stars.

Availability
Talk of the Town Tora-san was released theatrically on December 27, 1978. In Japan, the film was released on videotape in 1996, and in DVD format in 1998, 2002 and 2008.

References
Notes

Bibliography
English
 
 

German
 

Japanese

External links
 
 Talk of the Town Tora-san at www.tora-san.jp (official site)

1978 films
Films directed by Yoji Yamada
1978 comedy films
1970s Japanese-language films
Otoko wa Tsurai yo films
Japanese sequel films
Shochiku films
Films with screenplays by Yôji Yamada
1970s Japanese films